The 1971–72 Ohio Bobcats men's basketball team represented Ohio University as a member of the Mid-American Conference in the college basketball season of 1971–72. The team was coached by Jim Snyder and played their home games at Convocation Center. The Bobcats finished with a record of 15–11 and won MAC regular season title with a conference record of 7–3. They received a bid to the NCAA tournament, where they lost to Marquette in the First Round.

Schedule

|-
!colspan=9 style=| Regular Season

|-
!colspan=9 style=| NCAA Tournament

Source:

Statistics

Team Statistics
Final 1971–72 Statistics

Source

Player statistics

Source

References

Ohio Bobcats men's basketball seasons
Ohio
Ohio
Ohio Bobcats men's basketball
Ohio Bobcats men's basketball